Aki Lahtinen (born 31 October 1958) is a Finnish former footballer.

External links
 
 Finland - International Player Records
 Veikkausliiga player statistics

1958 births
Living people
Finnish footballers
Finnish expatriate footballers
Finland international footballers
Footballers at the 1980 Summer Olympics
Olympic footballers of Finland
Notts County F.C. players
Mestaruussarja players
Association football defenders
Oulun Työväen Palloilijat players
Sportspeople from Jyväskylä
20th-century Finnish people